Signavio is a vendor of Business Process Management (BPM) software based in Berlin and Silicon Valley. Its main product is Signavio Process Manager, a web-based business process modeling tool. The company was acquired by SAP in March 2021.

History
The company was founded by a team of alumni from Hasso Plattner Institute (HPI) in Potsdam, Germany.

Prior to Signavio, the founders were involved in development of the world's first web modeler for BPMN at HPI. This technology, known as the "Oryx project", was published under an Open Source license and served as blueprint for the Signavio Process Manager.

Signavio is headquartered in Berlin, Germany. In 2012, the company was incorporated in the United States as Signavio Inc. with an office in Burlington, Massachusetts. The company is fully owned by the founders and staff.

On January 21, 2021, SAP announced that it would acquire Signavio. The acquisition was completed on March 5, 2021.

Awards
In 2011, the German Federal Ministry of Economy and Technology named Signavio "ICT startup of the Year" and selected the firm for its "German Silicon Valley Accelerator" program.

References

External links
 

Software companies of Germany
Companies based in Berlin
Diagramming software
Technical communication tools
Windows graphics-related software
Unix software
Vector graphics editors
Graphics software
Workflow applications
2021 mergers and acquisitions